Lieutenant-Colonel William Percy Taylor  (15 March 1894 – 2 September 1964) was an Australian politician.

He was born in Cobar. In 1940 he was elected to the Tasmanian House of Assembly as a Labor member for Wilmot in a recount following Eric Ogilvie's resignation. He served as a minister from 1943 to 1946, when he was defeated for re-election. Taylor died in 1964.

References

1894 births
1964 deaths
Members of the Tasmanian House of Assembly
Recipients of the Military Cross
Australian Labor Party members of the Parliament of Tasmania
20th-century Australian politicians